Mootaz Bellah Mohamad Ahmad Mohamad El Jounaidi (born 26 September 1986) is a Lebanese professional footballer who plays as a centre-back for  club Sagesse, whom he captains.

Club career 
Jounaidi joined Ansar's youth team in 2001, and made his senior debut during the 2006–07 season. He joined Dibba Al Fujairah in the UAE First Division League in September 2013. The following year, Jounaidi was sent on a one-year loan to Iraqi Premier League side Naft Al-Janoob.

Following his two loan experiences, he returned to Ansar in August 2015. In January 2017, Jounaidi moved to FELDA United in the Malaysia Super League on a one-year loan. In June 2021, he renewed with Ansar for two seasons. Jounaidi left Ansar in July 2022, after having spent over 21 years with the club.

On 12 July 2022, Jounaidi signed for Sagesse on a free transfer.

International career 
Jounaidi represented Lebanon internationally at under-23 level at the 2008 Summer Olympics qualifiers in 2007. At the senior level, he appeared in qualifying matches for the 2010, 2014 and 2018 FIFA World Cup. In December 2018, Jounaidi was called up for the 2019 AFC Asian Cup squad.

Style of play 
While not a fast player, Jounaidi's strengths lie in his experience and aerial threat.

Honours 
Ansar
 Lebanese Premier League: 2005–06, 2006–07, 2020–21
 Lebanese FA Cup: 2001–02, 2005–06, 2006–07, 2009–10, 2011–12, 2020–21; runner-up: 2021–22
 Lebanese Super Cup: 2012, 2021; runner-up: 2002, 2010
 Lebanese Elite Cup runner-up: 2005, 2008, 2010

See also
 List of Lebanon international footballers

Notes

References

External links

 Mootaz Jounaidi at RSSSF
 
 
 
 

1986 births
Living people
Footballers from Beirut
Lebanese footballers
Association football central defenders
Al Ansar FC players
Dibba FC players
Naft Al-Basra SC players
Felda United F.C. players
Sagesse SC footballers
Lebanese Premier League players
UAE First Division League players
Iraqi Premier League players
Malaysia Super League players
Lebanese expatriate footballers
Lebanese expatriate sportspeople in the United Arab Emirates
Lebanese expatriate sportspeople in Iraq
Lebanese expatriate sportspeople in Malaysia
Expatriate footballers in the United Arab Emirates
Expatriate footballers in Iraq
Expatriate footballers in Malaysia
Lebanon youth international footballers
Lebanon international footballers
2019 AFC Asian Cup players